Sworn Vengeance may refer to: 
Sworn Vengeance (band), an American metalcore band
Sworn Vengeance (album), by death metal band Severe Torture